Marcodava was a Dacian town, north-west of Apulon.

See also 
 Dacian davae
 List of ancient cities in Thrace and Dacia
 Dacia
 Roman Dacia

References

Further reading 

 

Dacian towns